Marian Kent Hurd McNeely (July 26, 1877 – December 8, 1930) was an American children's book author. Her work Jumping-Off Place received a Newbery Honor in 1930.

Biography
Marian Kent Hurd was born in Dubuque, Iowa in 1877. She worked for a newspaper around the turn of the century, writing a column from 1903 to 1906. She then left for Italy for a year. She married Lee McNeely on May 4, 1910. They had four children.

For two years, they homesteaded at Rosebud Indian Reservation, which became the inspiration for The Jumping-Off Place.

Apart from her books, McNeely wrote short stories and poems which appeared in publications such as St. Nicholas Magazine, Literary Digest, Ladies' Home Journal and the Saturday Review of Literature. A Ballade of Losers, was a humorous poem about being an also-ran for the Newbery Medal.

She was killed on December 8, 1930 when she was hit by a car while crossing a street.

Works

1905: Miss Billy
1909: When she came home from college
1928: Rusty Ruston: A story for brothers and sisters
1929: The Jumping-Off Place
1931: Winning Out
1932: The way to glory and other stories

References

External links
 South Dakota History article on McNeely, with photograph
  (including 1 "from old catalog")

1877 births
1930 deaths
Newbery Honor winners
20th-century American writers
20th-century American women writers
American children's writers
Writers from Iowa
People from Dubuque, Iowa
20th-century American journalists